The Fantome class was a six-ship class of 4-gun screw composite sloops  built for the Royal Navy during 1873 and 1874.

Design

Construction
Fantome and her sister ships were constructed of an iron frame sheathed with teak and copper (hence 'composite').

Propulsion
A two-cylinder horizontal compound-expansion steam engine provided by Humphrys, Tennant & Co. powered an  diameter screw. Daring was fitted with a trunk engine provided by John Penn & Sons.

Sailing rig
All the ships of the class were provided with a full barque rig.

Armament
The Fantome class carried two  and two 64-pounder muzzle-loading rifles, all mounted on pivots.

Evaluation
Built at a time of great technological change in naval architecture, these composite sloops were obsolete before they were completed.   Nevertheless, they served a useful function on the far-flung stations of the British Empire, including participation in minor wars, such as the Perak War.  They were also used for hydrography, and for this reason Egeria was retained until 1911.

Ships

Notes

Bibliography

 

Sloop classes
 
 Fantome